Huangnitang is a village of Zhoutang village, Tianma Subdistrict, Changshan County, Quzhou, Zhejiang Province, China. It is the location of the Global Boundary Stratotype Section and Point (GSSP), which marks the boundary between the Third and Darriwilian Stages of the Middle Ordovician. The GSSP was ratified by the International Union of Geological Sciences in 1997.

The boundary is defined as the first appearance of the graptolite Undulograptus austrodentatus.  The graptolite Arienigraptus zhejiangensis appears 0.5 m below this boundary. The rock section is shale.

See also
 List of villages in China

References

External links 

 
 

Geology of China
Villages in China
Stratigraphy
Quzhou